Qareh Ughlan (also Romanized as Qareh Ūghlān; also known as Qarah A‘lān) is a village in Chaharduli Rural District, Keshavarz District, Shahin Dezh County, West Azerbaijan Province, Iran. At the 2006 census, its population was 181, in 34 families.

References 

Populated places in Shahin Dezh County